Ankush Jaiswal (born 16 June 1992) is an Indian cricketer who plays for Mumbai. He made his first-class debut on 23 November 2015 in the 2015–16 Ranji Trophy.

References

External links
 

1992 births
Living people
Indian cricketers
Mumbai cricketers
Place of birth missing (living people)